Clotrimazole/betamethasone dipropionate, sold under the brand name Lotrisone among others, is a topical medication used for the treatment of fungal infections of the feet, groin, and body in people 17 years of age and older. It is a combination of clotrimazole and betamethasone dipropionate. It is applied to the skin.

Common side effects include paresthesia, rash, edema, and secondary infections.

In 2020, it was the 308th most commonly prescribed medication in the United States, with more than 1million prescriptions.

Medical uses 
Clotrimazole/betamethasone dipropionate is indicated for the topical treatment of symptomatic inflammatory tinea pedis, tinea cruris, and tinea corporis due to Epidermophyton floccosum, Trichophyton mentagrophytes, and Trichophyton rubrum in people 17 years of age and older.

Society and culture

Legal status 
Clotrimazole/betamethasone dipropionate cream was approved for medical use in the United States in July 1984, and the lotion was approved for use in the United States in December 2000.

References

External links 
 
 
 

Combination drugs
Corticosteroids
Imidazole antifungals